Radio Slon is a Bosnian local commercial radio station, broadcasting from Tuzla, Bosnia and Herzegovina. This radio station broadcasts a variety of programs such as local news, talk show, music, entertainment and comic program.

Radio Slon was founded on 27 December 1995 as private, commercial radio station by the company Vidik d.o.o. Tuzla (RTV Slon).

Program is mainly produced in Bosnian language at one FM frequency (Tuzla ) and it is available in the city of Tuzla as well as in nearby municipalities in Tuzla Canton and Zenica-Doboj Canton area.

Estimated number of listeners of Radio Slon is around 213.948.

Television channels TV Slon Extra (terrestrial television in Tuzla area) and TV Slon Info (cable and online television station) are also part of company.

Frequencies
 Tuzla

See also 
 List of radio stations in Bosnia and Herzegovina
 Radio Tuzla
 Radio Tuzlanskog Kantona
 Radio Kameleon
 Narodni radio Tuzla
 Radio TNT Tuzla

References

External links 
 www.rtvslon.ba
 www.radiostanica.ba
 www.fmscan.org
 Communications Regulatory Agency of Bosnia and Herzegovina
Mass media in Tuzla
Tuzla
Radio stations established in 1995